Jim Henson's Bear in the Big Blue House is a 2002 video game developed by published by Ubisoft for the Game Boy Color and PlayStation, based on the The Jim Henson Company children's television show of the same name. A title for the Game Boy Advance was planned by Ubisoft, but not released.

Gameplay 

In Bear in the Big Blue House, the player plays as Ojo and explores the House to collect presents and puzzle pieces to complete a Birthday Picture. The game features two modes: Adventure, in which the player explores the House to find individual characters to complete seven minigames and obtain pieces, and Activity, in which players can complete minigames on their own. Each minigame has two difficulty modes, and span simple games involving mazes, catching, and simple memory tests.

Reception 

Bear in the Big Blue House received lukewarm reviews. Writing for Game Boy Xtreme, John Hagerty praised the game for its "nice graphics and variety of challenges on offer", although noting as a children's game "none of the sub-games are particularly difficult" and it "won't appeal to anyone old enough to read this review". Total Advance concurred the game would provide "a good few hours of educational fun" to its "definite target audience" of young children, sardonically noting the game was not for anyone "old enough to go to the toilet without help".

References

External links 
 

2002 video games
Cancelled Game Boy Advance games
Game Boy Color games
PlayStation (console) games
Single-player video games
Ubisoft games
Video games about bears
Video games about birthdays
Video games based on television series
Video games developed in the United Kingdom
Video games featuring female protagonists